Abū Ḩajar al A‘lá is a village in Jizan Province, in south-western Saudi Arabia.

See also 

 List of cities and towns in Saudi Arabia
 Regions of Saudi Arabia

References

Populated places in Jizan Province